The Benguet State University (BSU or BengSU) is a state university in the province of Benguet, Philippines. Its main campus is in La Trinidad.

History 

It started as the La Trinidad Farm School, which was elevated to Trinidad Agricultural School (TAS) in 1920. The school reopened after World War II and became the La Trinidad Agricultural High School. Four months later, it was nationalized and renamed as the Mountain National Agricultural School (MNAS). It was soon converted into the Mountain National College (MNAC), Mountain Agricultural College (MAC), and Mountain State Agricultural College (MSAC) in 1969 through Republic Act 5923.

On January 12, 1986, the school was converted into a chartered state university by virtue of Presidential Decree 2010.

As of May 2018, Benguet State University is recognized by the Commission on Higher Education (CHED) as a Center of Excellence (COE) for Teacher education, and Center of Development (COD) for both Agriculture education, and Nutrition and Dietetics.

Academics
BSU has two satellite campuses, eight colleges, two academic institutes, and a graduate school. It also runs an open university. These units offer graduate and undergraduate degree programs in agriculture, forestry, teacher's education, nursing, physical sciences and the arts. Some units offer non-degree programs and short courses.

Colleges and Institutions 
 College of Agriculture
  - Bachelor of Science in Agribusiness
  - Bachelor of Science in Agriculture
 College of Arts and Humanities
  - Bachelor of Arts in Communication
  - Bachelor of Arts in English Language
  - Bachelor of Arts in Filipino Language
 College of Criminal Justice Education
  - Bachelor of Science in Criminology
 College of Engineering 
  - Bachelor of Science in Agricultural & Biosystems Engineering
  - Bachelor of Science in Civil Engineering
  - Bachelor of Science in Electrical Engineering
  - Bachelor of Science in Industrial Engineering
 College of Forestry
  - Bachelor of Science in Forestry
 College of Home Economics and Technology
  - Bachelor of Science in Entrepreneurship
  - Bachelor of Science in Food Technology
  - Bachelor of Science in Hotel Management
  - Bachelor of Science in Nutrition and Dietetics
  - Bachelor of Science in Tourism Management
 College of Human Kinetics
  - Bachelor of Physical Education
  - Bachelor of Science in Exercise and Sports Science
 College of Information Sciences
  - Bachelor in Library and Information Services
  - Bachelor of Science in Development Communication
  - Bachelor of Science in Information Technology
 College of Medicine (SOON TO OPEN)
 College of Natural Sciences 
  - Bachelor of Science in Biology
  - Bachelor of Science in Chemistry
  - Bachelor of Science in Environmental Science
 College of Numeracy and Applied Science
  - Bachelor of Science in Mathematics
  - Bachelor of Science in Statistics
 College of Nursing
  - Bachelor of Science in Nursing
 College of Public Administration and Governance 
  - Bachelor of Public Administration
 College of Social Sciences
  - Bachelor of Arts in History
  - Bachelor of Science in Psychology 
 College of Teacher Education
  - Bachelor of Early Childhood Education
  - Bachelor of Elementary Education
  - Bachelor of Secondary Education
  - Bachelor of Technology and Livelihood Education
 College of Veterinary Medicine
  - Doctor of Veterinary Medicine
 Graduate School

 Open University

Campuses 
 La Trinidad, Benguet (Main Campus)
 Buguias, Benguet (Satellite Campus)
 Bokod, Benguet (Satellite Campus)
 Kapangan, Benguet (Satellite Campus)

Elementary and secondary schools
Besides having college campuses, the school had also elementary and secondary campuses called Elementary Laboratory School (ELS) and the secondary as the Secondary Laboratory School (SLS). The ELS campus is located at Km. 5, La Trinidad while the SLS campus is in the Outpost, La Trinidad.

See also
 La Trinidad Strawberry Farm

References

External links
 

Philippine Association of State Universities and Colleges
Universities and colleges in Benguet
State universities and colleges in the Philippines